Elections to Colchester Borough Council took place on 11 May 1951. This was on the same day as other local elections across the United Kingdom.

Ward Results
Source:

Abbey

Berechurch

Castle

Harbour

Lexden & Shrub End

Mile End

New Town

St. John's

St. Mary's

References

1951 English local elections
1951
1950s in Essex